Sunday Chizoba Nwadialu (born 10 October 1989) is a Nigerian footballer who plays as a striker. He currently plays for Rahmatganj MFS. He was a top scorer of 2016 Bangladesh Football Premier League.

Club career

Abahani SC

On 23 November 2018, he scored twice against Bashundhara Kings in the final of 2018 Bangladesh Federation Cup.

On 15 June 2019, he scored the hat-trick against Rahmatganj MFS in 2018-19 Bangladesh Football Premier League.

On 21 August 2019, he scored twice against North Korean Club April 25 in 2019 AFC Cup.

Achievements

Winners
Dhaka Abahani
 Bangladesh Premier League
2016

References 

Living people
Nigerian footballers
Association football forwards
Nigerian expatriate footballers
Expatriate footballers in Bangladesh
1989 births
Abahani Limited (Dhaka) players
Churchill Brothers FC Goa players
I-League players
Expatriate footballers in India
Rahmatganj MFS players